The 1929–30 National Hurling League was the fourth edition of the National Hurling League.

Each team played each of their rivals once with two points awarded for a win and one point awarded for a drawn game. The teams who finished top would advance to the knock-out stage, with the winners being declared National Hurling League champions.

Cork defeated Dublin by 3-5 to 3-0 in the final.

Results

Knock-out stage

References

National Hurling League seasons
League
League